The Graham Norton Show is a British comedy chat show broadcast on BBC One in the United Kingdom. It was shown on BBC Two from February 2007 to May 2009 and has been on BBC One since October 2009. Presented by Irish comedian Graham Norton, the show's format is very similar to his previous Channel 4 programmes, So Graham Norton and V Graham Norton, both of which were also produced by So Television.

The show's latest series, the thirtieth, ended on 10 March 2023.

Series overview

Episodes

Series 1 (2007)

Series 2 (2007)

Series 3 (2008)

Series 4 (2008)

Series 5 (2009)

Series 6 (2009)

Series 7 (2010)

Series 8 (2010–11)

Series 9 (2011)

Series 10 (2011–12)

Series 11 (2012)

Series 12 (2012–13)

Series 13 (2013)

Series 14 (2013–14)

Series 15 (2014)

Series 16 (2014–15)

Series 17 (2015)

Series 18 (2015–16)

Series 19 (2016)

Series 20 (2016–17)

Series 21 (2017)

Series 22 (2017–18)

Series 23 (2018)

Series 24 (2018–19)

Series 25 (2019)

Series 26 (2019–2020)

Series 27 (2020)
This series was recorded remotely from the guests' homes with no studio audience due to the COVID-19 pandemic.

Series 28 (2020–2021)

Series 29 (2021–22)

Series 30 (2022–23)

Footnotes

References



Graham Norton
Lists of variety television series episodes
Lists of British comedy television series episodes